The Asante, also known as Ashanti are part of the Akan ethnic group and are native to the Ashanti Region of modern-day Ghana. Asantes are the last group to emerge out of the various Akan civilisations. Twi is spoken by over nine million Asante people as a first or second language.

The wealthy, gold-rich Asante people developed the large and influential Ashanti Empire, along the Lake Volta and Gulf of Guinea. The empire was founded in 1670, and the capital Kumase was founded in 1680 by Asantehene (emperor) Osei Kofi Tutu I on the advice of Okomfo Anokye, his premier. Sited at the crossroads of the Trans-Saharan trade, the Kumase megacity's strategic location contributed significantly to its growing wealth. Over the duration of the Kumase metropolis' existence, a number of peculiar factors have combined to transform the Kumase metropolis into a financial centre and political capital. The main causal factors included the unquestioning loyalty to the Asante rulers and the Kumase metropolis' growing wealth, derived in part from the capital's lucrative domestic-trade in items such as gold, slaves, and bullion.

Nomenclature

In the Asante dialect of Twi, Asantefo; singular masculine: Asantenibarima, singular feminine: Asantenibaa. The name Asante "warlike" is traditionally asserted by scholars to derive from the 1670s as the Asante went from being a tributary state to a centralized hierarchical kingdom. Asantehene Osei Tutu I, military leader and head of the Asante Oyoko clan, founded the Asante Empire. Osei Tutu I obtained the support of other clan chiefs and, using Kumase as the central base, subdued surrounding Akan states. Osei Tutu challenged and eventually defeated Denkyira in 1701, and this is the asserted modern origin of the name.

Geography

The Ashanti Region has a variable terrain, coasts and mountains, wildlife sanctuary and strict nature reserve and national parks, forests and grasslands, lush agricultural areas, and near savannas, enriched with vast deposits of industrial minerals, most notably vast deposits of gold.

The territory Asante people settled is home to a volcanic crater lake, Lake Bosumtwi, and Asante is bordered westerly to Lake Volta within the central part of present-day Ghana. The Asante (Kingdom of Asante) territory is densely forested, mostly fertile and to some extent mountainous. There are two seasons—the rainy season (April to November) and the dry season (December to March). The land has several streams; the dry season, however is extremely desiccated. Ashanti Region is hot year round.

Today Asante people number close to 3 million. Asante Twi, the majority language, is a member of the Central Tano languages within the Kwa languages. Asante political power combines Asantehene Otumfuo Nana Osei Tutu II as the political head of the Asantes and the Ashanti Region, with Asante semi-one-party state representative New Patriotic Party, and since the Ashanti Region (and the Kingdom of Asante) state political union with Ghana, the Asante remain largely influential.

Asantes reside in Asante and Brong Ahafo Regions in Ghana. Kumase metropolis, the capital of Asante (Kingdom of Asante), has also been the historic capital of the Asante Kingdom. The Ashanti Region currently has a population of 11 million (11,000,000).

Today, as in the past, the Ashanti Regioncontinues to make significant contributions to Ghana's economy. Asante is richly endowed with industrial minerals and agricultural implements, Asante is responsible for much of Ghana's domestic food production and for the foreign exchange Ghana earns from cocoa, agricultural implements, gold, bauxite, manganese, various other industrial minerals, and timber. Kumase metropolis and Ashanti Region produces 96% of Ghana's exports.

History

Asante Empire

In the 1670s the Ashanti went from being a tributary state to the centralized hierarchical Denkyira kingdom. Asantehene Osei Kofi Tutu I, military leader and head of the Oyoko clan, founded the Asante kingdom. Osei Tutu obtained the support of other clan chiefs and using Kumase as the central base, subdued surrounding states. Osei Tutu challenged and eventually defeated Denkyira in 1701, and presumptuously from this, the name Asante came to be.

Realizing the weakness of a loose confederation of Akan states, Osei Tutu strengthened centralization of the surrounding Akan groups and expanded the powers judiciary system within the centralized government. Thus, this loose confederation of small city-states grew into a kingdom or empire looking to expand its land. Newly conquered areas had the option of joining the empire or becoming tributary states. Opoku Ware I, Osei Tutu's successor, extended the borders.

Sovereignty and independence

Because of the long history of mutual interaction between Asante and European powers, the Asante have the greatest amount of historiography in all of sub-Saharan Africa. In the 1920s the British catalogued Asante religion, familial, and legal systems in works such as R. S. Rattray's Asante Law and Constitution. The Asante state strongly resisted attempts by Europeans, mainly the Kingdom of Great Britain, to conquer them. The Asante limited British influence in the Asante State, as Britain annexed neighbouring areas. The Asante were described as a fierce organized people whose king "can bring 200,000 men into the field and whose warriors are evidently not cowed by Snider rifles and 7-pounder guns".

The Ashanti Empire was one of the few African states that seriously resisted European colonization. Between 1823 and 1896, the United Kingdom of Great Britain and Ireland fought four wars against the Asante kings: the Anglo-Asante Wars. In 1901, the British finally defeated the state following the 1900 War of the Golden Stool and the Ashanti Empire was made a a British protectorate, in 1902, and the office of Asantehene was discontinued with the Asante capital Kumasi annexed into the British empire; however, the Asante still largely governed themselves. Asante gave little to no deference to colonial authorities. In 1926, the British permitted the repatriation of Asantehene Prempeh I – whom they had exiled to the Seychelles in 1896 – and allowed him to adopt the title Kumasehene, but not Asantehene. However, in 1935, the British finally granted the Asante self-rule sovereignty as Kingdom of Asante, and the Asante King title of Asantehene was revived.

Culture and traditions

Asante culture celebrates Adae, Adae Kese, Akwasidae, Awukudae and Asante Yam festival. The Seperewa, a 10-14 stringed harp-lute, as well as the Fontomfrom drums are originally from the Bono Akan people.  Kente cloth]]ing.

Society and Customs
Asante are a matrilineal society where line of descent is traced through the female. Historically, this mother progeny relationship determined land rights, inheritance of property, offices and titles. It is also true that the Asante inherit property from the paternal side of the family.

Though not considered as important as the mother, the male interaction continues in the place of birth after marriage.

Historically, an Asante girl was betrothed with a golden ring called "petia" (I love you), if not in childhood, immediately after the puberty ceremony. They did not regard marriage "awade" as an important ritual event, but as a state that follows soon and normally after the puberty ritual. The puberty rite was and is important as it signifies passage from childhood to adulthood in that chastity is encouraged before marriage. The Asante required that various goods be given by the boy's family to that of the girl, not as a 'bride price', but to signify an agreement between the two families.

Asante Womanhood 
In the Asante culture, Womanhood is marked by Puberty rites termed "bragoro." Bragoro is a ceremony that is conducted for girls in the community from the ages of 13 to 20. The precursor to bragoro puberty rites is onset by the beginning of Menstruation in a girl’s life. The purpose of bragoro rites is to enable women to get married, showcase them to society, teach them how to be wives and mothers, and signify the coming of age of girls. The cultural symbolism in the ceremony represents the meaning of womanhood in Asante.

In the bragoro puberty rites, girls’ heads are shaved and dyed black. Every day during the rites, young girls in the community feed the chosen girls boiled eggs, fish, and eto. Alongside, the older women in the community, called mmerewa, teach the girls about marriage, motherhood, and morality. The merewa bathe the girls in a neighboring stream. Then, the mmerewa dress the young ladies in white cloth (ntoma) and gold jewelry. Afterward, the girls are showcased to the entire community with songs, dances, and praises.

For the Asante, every color and object has cultural significance meaning, which reflects the meaning of womanhood in Asante culture. 

Ntoma/Cloth

The white color of the ntoma/cloth that the girls are dressed in signifies vitality, sanctity, victory, and purity.

Gold Jewelry

The gold/yellow color of the jewelry that the girls are adorned with signifies royalty, continuous life, and wealth. This is related to the matrilineal system of the Asante. The matrilineal system of the Asante culturally gives women a sense of authority, continuity, and the right to become a breadwinner and make money. This is displayed in the roles of adult women in society, obaapanin (female elder), and the ohemaa (queen) stool, which ranks higher than the male counterpart.

Fish

In the bragoro rites, eating fish signifies the obtaining of wisdom and knowledge. Wisdom and Knowledge are seen as a keen part of womanhood for Asantes. In Asante royalty, the Asantehemaa (queen mother) is seen as the advisor of the Asantehene (king), full of wisdom and knowledge. This thought is carried through Asante culture and society to characterize the everyday woman, and convey a key aspect of Asante womanhood–being an advisor.

Law and legal system

In the cataloguing of Asante familial and legal systems in R.S. Rattray's Asante Law and Constitution Asante law specifies that sexual relations between a man and certain women are forbidden, even though not related by blood. The punishment for offense is death, although it does not carry quite the same stigma to an Asante clan as incest. Sexual relations between a man and any one of the following women is forbidden:
 A half-sister by one father, but by a different clan mother;
 A father's brother's daughter;
 A woman of the same father;
 A brother's wife;
 A son's wife;
 A wife's mother;
 An uncle's wife;
 A wife of any man of the same "company";
 A wife of any man of the same guild or trade;
 A wife of one's own slave;
 A father's other wife from a different clan.

Language

The Asante people speak Asante Twi, which is the official language of the Ashanti Region and the main language spoken in Asante and by the Asante people. Asante language is spoken by over 9 million ethnic Asante people as a first or second language. The Asante language is the official language utilized for literacy in Asante, at the primary and elementary educational stage (Primary 1–3) K–12 (education) level, and studied at university as a bachelor's degree or master's degree program in Asante.

The Asante language and Asante Twi have some unique linguistic features like tone, vowel harmony and nasalization.

Religion
The Asante follow Akan religion and the Asante religion (a traditional religion which seems to be dying slowly but is revived only on major special occasions—yet is undergoing a global revival across the diaspora), followed by Christianity (Roman Catholicism and Protestantism) and Islam.

Asante people received the religion of Islamic North Africa within their talismanic tradition, making amulets with Quranic citations, name of the Arabic angels or Jinn. Amulets were also set in the corners of houses or soaked in water to produce liquids for drinking and for washing that were believed to have thaumaturgical properties.

Asante diaspora
The Asante live in the Ashanti Region, specifically in the capital of Kumase, and, due to the Atlantic slave trade, a known diaspora of Asante exists in the Caribbean, particularly in Jamaica. Slaves captured and sold to the European slave traders along the coasts were sent to the West Indies, particularly Jamaica, Barbados, Netherlands Antilles, British Virgin Islands, the Bahamas, Guyana, Suriname, etc. Asante were known to be very opposed to both the Fante Confederacy and the British, as the Asante only traded with the Dutch in times of their ascension to becoming a hegemony of most of the area of present-day Ghana.

Coromantee, the English-language term for enslaved Akan people, came from the original name of the Dutch slave fort of Fort Amsterdam (Fort Kormantse). This was despite this fort being primarily occupied by the Dutch during its history and having no records of trade to Jamaica while being under Dutch ownership. Evidence of Asante and Akan-day names and Asante and Akan-surnames (but mispronounced by the English), Adinkra symbols on houses, Anansi stories and the dialect of Jamaican Patois being heavily influenced by Twi, can all be found on the island of Jamaica. White planter Edward Long, like other planters before him, described "Coromantees" the same way that the British in the Gold Coast would the "Asantes", which was to be "warlike". Edward Long states that others around "Asantes" and "Coromantees" feared them the same way as they were feared in Jamaica and from the hinterlands of the Gold Coast.

According to BioMed Central (BMC biology) in 2012, the average Jamaican has 60% of Asante matrilineal DNA and, today Asante is the only ethnic group by name known to contemporary Jamaicans. Famous Jamaican individuals such as: Marcus Garvey and his first wife, Amy Ashwood Garvey, are of Asante descent. It is commonplace for many Jamaicans to have this descent. Also are Jamaican freedom fighters during slavery: Nanny of the Maroons (now a Jamaican National Heroine), Tacky and Jack Mansong or Three-finger Jack. The names Nanny and Tacky are English corruptions of Asante words and names: "Nanny" is a corruption of the Asante word Nana, meaning "king/queen/grandparent", the name Tacky is a corruption of the Asante surname Takyi, and Mansong is a corruption of the Asante surname Manso, respectively.

Gallery

See also
List of rulers of Asante

References

Literature
Robert B. Edgerton, 1995, The Fall of the Asante Empire. The Hundred-Year War for Africa's Gold Coast. New York, 
Ernest E. Obeng, 1986, Ancient Asante Chieftaincy, Ghana Publishing Corporation, 
Alan Lloyd, 1964, The Drums of Kumase, London: Panther
Alfred Kofi Quarcoo, 1972, 1994, The Language of Adinkra Symbols Legon, Ghana: Sebewie Ventures (Publications), PO Box 222, Legon. 
Kevin Shillington, 1995 (1989), History of Africa, New York: St. Martin's Press,
N. Kyeremateng, K. Nkansa, 1996, The Akans of Ghana: their history & culture, Accra: Sebewie Publishers
Dennis M. Warren 1986, The Akan of Ghana: An Overview of the Ethnographic Literature, Accra: Pointer

External links

Asante People hand History Profiles history and other aspects of the Asante.
Asante Page at the Ethnographic Atlas, maintained at Centre for Social Anthropology and Computing, University of Kent, Canterbury
Asante Kingdom at the Wonders of the African World, at PBS
Asante Culture contains a selected list of Internet sources on the topic, especially sites that serve as comprehensive lists or gateways
Africa Guide contains information about the culture of the Asante
Historical Notes and Memorial Inscriptions from Ghana

 
Ethnic groups in Ghana
West African people